Tamgha-i-Jurat, is the fourth highest military award of Pakistan. This citation is awarded for extraordinary heroism while engaged in armed combat with an opposing force on Pakistan soil or outside its borders. The  award was established in 1957 after Pakistan became a republic, however, it was instituted retrospectively back to 1947. This medal is awarded for various types of high risk tactical missions like combat, tactical reconnaissance and infiltration and can be bestowed upon all ranks, commissioned officers and non-commissioned officers, in the Pakistan Army, Navy, Air Force, and the paramilitary Civil Armed Forces such as the Frontier Corps, the Frontier Constabulary and the Pakistan Rangers. Ranked below the Sitara-i-Jurat on the order of precedence, the Tamgha-i-Jurat is the equivalent to the Military Cross in the U.K Commonwealth honours system and the Silver Star in the United States honours system.

List of Recipients
Pakistan Army

 Subaidar Abdul aziz magray, TJ 1971
 Sep. Noor Muhammad shaheed, TJ 51punjab(now 15sindh) regiment date of shahadat (4.12.1971)in punch op at Chand Tekri Kashmir
 Sep. Farman Ali from Shishakt, Hunza (1st Punjab Regiment) TJ, 1948
 Maj. Habib ur Rehman Qureshi AJK, 1971
 Sub Zulifqar Ali operation Al meezan 2012/13
 Lieutenant Colonel Derek Joseph, 1971
 Lt Col Muhammad Akram khan (Mardan) Embraced martyrdom on 05-Dec-1971 at the age 28
 Lance Havaldar Laal Khan (Baloch Regiment), TJ, 1958
 Capt. Aftab Ahmed TJ 
 Hon. Capt Falak Sher TJ 1971
 Capt Ghulam Hussain Cheema TJ 1965
 Havaldar Muhammad Karim NLI (15 july) (TJ) 1999
 Sepoy Liaquat Ali, 1 Sind Regiment while serving with 24 Sind Regt 1999 
 Khushi Muhammad TJ TK1 1965
 Lance Naik Laal Hussain TJ 1965
 Defedar Rana Abdul Majeed Khan, TJ 1965
 Col Mirza Hassan Khan
 Capt Sabir Shah TJ
 N/Sub Ibarat Shah TJ, Northern Scout 1947
 Hav Khayal Akbar Khan Orakazi, TJ,(7 FF 1948)
 Havaldar Hukamdad Abbasi TJ
 Lance Naik Shadab Wali Khan TJ, 39 Baloch 1971
 Sep/Clk Muhammad Akbar TJ, 4 Punjab, 1971
 Col/ Muhammad Saleem TJ 
 Maj/ Muhammad Iftikhar Ahmad TJ, 1971, Army Aviation, Choor Sector
 Sep Muhmad Ghraz (6 NLI) TJ, 1999
Cap.Asfandyar Bukhari (11 FFR) TJ 1, 2015
Captain Roohullah (Baloch Light Commando Battalion), 2016
Lance Nayek Syed Munawar Hussain Shah (3 FFR) TJ, 1965 
 Lt Khalil Ahmad Shaheed (650 Mujahid Regiment) TJ, 1991
 Subaidar Raja Mehrban Khan Minhas ( kahuta,Narh)-1965 13FF

Pakistan Air Force

Gallantry 1965
 Flying Officer Muhammad Hamidullah Khan TJ, SH, 1965 - (doc. 30.06.62 34TH GD (P) Course no. 1 SQN), Pakistan Air Force Academy, Risalpur; Sialkot- Pathankot infiltration, from Pakistan Air Force Base Chaklala, Rawalpindi. 29.03.1971 defected allegiance to BDF, then as Flight Lieutenant, Asst. Provost Marshal, CO - No. 5 P&S Unit (Provost and Security), Dacca

Posthumous 1965

 Leading Aircraftman Muhammad Anwar Hussain Khan TJ
 
Gallantry 1965

Master Warrant Officer M Ashfaq TJ
Master Warrant Officer M Hafeez TJ
Corporal M Omer Ali TJ
Corporal Sher Mohammad TJ
Corporal Technician Ghulam Abbas TJ
Corporal Technician Muhammad Ghazanfar Pak 76361 TJ

Posthumous 1971
Flight Lieutenant Javed Iqbal TJ
Flight Lieutenant Syed Shahid Raza TJ

Gallantry 1971
Flight Lieutenant Ghulam Murtaza Malik TJ
Flight Lieutenant Taloot Mirza TJ
Flight Lieutenant Maqsood Amir TJ
Flight Lieutenant Javed Latif TJ
Flight Lieutenant Abdul Karim Bhatti TJ
Warrant Officer Abdul Haq shah TJ
Senior Technician Sajjad A Shah TJ
Senior Technician Asghar Ali TJ
Corporal Muhammad Ghazanfar TJ
Corporal M Afzal Abbasi TJ
Junior Technician Muhammad Latif TJ
Gallantry 2006 
2nd Lieutenant Imran Ahmed Khan TJ

February 2019
Sq Leader Hasan Mehmood Siddiqui was awarded Tamgha-i-Jurat - Pakistan and India were involved in a rare aerial engagement which had ignited fears of an all-out conflict. On February 27, PAF shot down two Indian warplanes in Pakistan’s airspace and captured Indian pilot Abhinandan Varthaman who was released on March 1 as a “peace gesture”.
Wing Commander Noman Ali was conferred Sitara-i-Jurat
<ref>

Notes and references

Nishan-e-Haider, from Pakistan Television Corp (PTV). Television drama on Captain Raja Muhammad Sarwar Shaheed, Rashid Minhas Shaheed, Momin and Major Raja Aziz Bhatti Shaheed
Edward Haynes webpage on Pakistani awards
Geocities website on military wards

See also

 Pakistani Armed Forces
 Awards and decorations of the Pakistan military

External links
 Paktribune.com
 Pakistan's Medals
 Decorations and Medals of Pakistan

Military awards and decorations of Pakistan
Awards established in 1957
1957 establishments in Pakistan